The Tristan da Cunha Island Council is the legislature of the island of Tristan da Cunha in the Atlantic Ocean. The composition of the Island Council consists of the Administrator of Tristan da Cunha as the presiding officer, plus three appointed and eight elected members. At least one elected member of the council must be a woman.

Electoral system
The 12-member Island Council consists of the Administrator as President, three appointed members and eight elected members, who are elected by plurality-at-large voting. At least one elected member of the council must be a woman. If there are no women among the eight candidates that receive the most votes, only the top seven male candidates are declared elected, alongside the woman that received the highest number of votes. If there are no female candidates, a by-election is held for the eighth seat, in which only female candidates can stand.

The Chief Islander is elected on a separate ballot by first-past-the-post voting, and must also be elected to the Island Council to be eligible to become Chief Islander.

Council members

2019 elections 
On 26 March 2019, with a turnout of 74.6%, the following eight Councillors were elected to the Tristan da Cunha Island Council for the 2019 to 2022 legislative term:
Clive Glass
Rodney Green
Paul Repetto
Steve Swain
James Glass
Kelly Green
Jason Green
Ian Lavarello

In addition, the three additional Councillors, who were appointed to the Island Council by Administrator of Tristan da Cunha are:
Carlene Glass-Green
Warren Glass
Dawn Repetto

Previous Councils

2007–10 
In 2007, the following were elected to serve on the Island Council: Lorraine Repetto, Conrad Glass, Robin Repetto, Dereck Charles Rogers, Ian Lavarello, James Patrick Glass, Iris Green, Lillie Carlene Swain, Lorraine Repetto, Conrad Glass, Robin Repetto, Dereck Charles Rogers, Ian Lavarello, James Patrick Glass, Iris Green, Lillie Carlene Swain. The following were co-opted by Administrator (all had previously been Chief Islanders): Harold Green, Anne Green, Lewis Green. The turnout at the election was 56.2%, markedly lower than in previous years.

2010–13 
In 2010, all the council posts were uncontested (an election had been scheduled for 10 March). The following candidates were therefore returned without election: Ian Lavarello, Robin Repetto, Marion Green, Beverley Repetto, Dereck Rogers, James Glass, Lorraine Repetto, Iris Green, Dawn Repetto, Conrad Glass, and Anne Green.

2013–16 
As with 2010, there were eight nominations for the eight places on the Island Council so an election was not held and all candidates were automatically returned. Apart from Ian Lavarello, all the new councillors had not served before. The returned candidates were: Leon Glass, Warren Glass, Joanne Green, Ian Lavarello, Gerald Repetto, Beverley Swain, Emma Swain, Neil Swain. Additionally, the Administrator co-opted Iris Green, Conrad Glass and Lorraine Repetto.

2016–19 
On 9 March 2016, with a turnout of 83%, the following eight Councillors were elected to the Tristan da Cunha Island Council for the 2016 to 2019 legislative term:
James Patrick Glass
Warren Glass
Sarah Green
Terence Green
Ian Lavarello
Lorraine Repetto
Emma Swain
Paula Swain

In addition, the three additional Councillors, who were appointed to the Island Council by Administrator of Tristan da Cunha, Alex Mitham, are:
Conrad Glass
Harold Green
Iris Green

Chief Islanders 
Voters can choose on a separate list councillors candidates who are also candidates for being Chief Islander, and the candidate with the most votes become Tristan da Cunha's Chief Islander. The following were elected to the post for the years indicated:
 1970–73: Harold Green
 1973–79: Albert Glass
 1979–82: Harold Green (second term)
 1982–85: Albert Glass (second term)
 1985–88: Harold Green (third term)
 1988–91: Anne Green
 1991–94: Lewis Glass
 1994–1997: James Glass
 1997-2000: James Glass (second term)
 2000-2003: James Glass (third term)
 2003–07: Anne Green (second term)
 2007–10: Conrad Glass
 2010–19: Ian Lavarello
 2019-2022: James Glass (fourth term)
 2022-2025: James Glass (fifth term)

See also
Legislative Council of Saint Helena
Ascension Island Council

References

Notes

Citations

External links
Tristan da Cunha Island Council

Legislatures of British Overseas Territories
Politics of Saint Helena
Island Council
Island Council